The Heath Brothers was an American jazz group, formed in 1975 in Philadelphia, by the brothers Jimmy (tenor saxophone), Percy (bass), and Albert "Tootie" Heath (drums); and pianist Stanley Cowell. Tony Purrone (guitar) and Jimmy's son Mtume (percussion) joined the group later. Tootie left in 1978, and was replaced by Akira Tana for a short period, before returning in 1982. They also added other sidemen for some of their recording dates.

The group issued four singles between 1978 and 1981, "Mellowdrama", "For the Public", "Use it (Don't Abuse it)" and "Dreamin'".  "Dreamin'", a track from the 1980 LP, "Expressions of Life", had the most airplay in the UK despite not reaching the UK chart.

The group with just two of the brothers, Jimmy and Tootie, and additional sidemen as needed, continued to perform and record after Percy died in 2004. The DVD, Brotherly Jazz: The Heath Brothers, recorded in 2004, shortly before Percy's death, was one of the last times the three brothers played together, and chronicled the brothers' personal lives, as well as socio-political issues many jazz musicians dealt with in the later 20th century, including jail, drugs, discrimination and segregation. The 2009 CD Endurance was the first without Percy, and features seven original numbers by Jimmy, including "From a Lonely Bass", composed in memory of his late brother.

Jimmy Heath died on January 19, 2020.

Discography
 Marchin' On (1975) (Strata-East Records)
 Passin' Thru (1978) (Columbia Records)
 Live at the Public Theatre (1979) (Columbia Records)
 In Motion (1979)  (Columbia Records)
 Expressions of Life (1980)  (Columbia Records)
 Brotherly Love (1981) (Antilles Records)
 Brothers and Others (1981) (Antilles Records)
 Dave's Haze (1997) (Concord Records)
 As We Were Saying (1997) (Concord Records)
 Jazz Family (1998) (Concord Records)
 Pat Metheny & The Heath Brothers: The Move to the Groove Session (2000) (West Wind)
 Endurance (2009) (Jazz Legacy Productions)

Videography
 Brotherly Jazz (2006) (DanSun Productions)

References

External links

JimmyHeath.com biography of Jimmy Heath
"Albert "Tootie" Heath", Drummerworld.
A complete Heath Brothers discography on musicmatch.com. 
Jean-Michel Reisser, "The Heath Brothers" biographies and CD review of Brotherly Love, Cosmopolis, September 1, 2008, in French.
Brotherly Jazz: The Heath Brothers DVD Documentary
 Patrick Jarenwattananon, "The Heath Brothers - Live at the Village Vanguard", NPR Music, July 6, 2011. (Listen, 1:11:04.)

American jazz ensembles from Pennsylvania
Hard bop ensembles
African-American musical groups
Musical groups from Philadelphia
Sibling musical groups
Strata-East Records artists
Columbia Records artists
Antilles Records artists
Jazz musicians from Pennsylvania
Black & Blue Records artists